Cyperus flaccidus is a sedge of the family Cyperaceae that is native to  Australia.

Description
It blooms between May and April producing green flowers.

There are two to eight flattened spikelets cluster containing 20 flowers.

Taxonomy
The species was first formally described by the botanist Robert Brown in 1810 as part of the work Prodromus florae Novae Hollandiae et insulae Van-Diemen, exhibens characteres plantarum quas annis 1802-1805. The two known synonyms are; Cyperus trinervis var. flaccidus and Cyperus macellus.

Distribution
It is endemic to the eastern states of Australia where it has a scattered distribution throughout eastern Queensland and New South Wales, western Victoria and eastern South Australia. It has small isolated populations in the Northern Territory and the Kimberley region of Western Australia. It is mostly situated in creek beds and other damp areas.

See also
List of Cyperus species

References

Plants described in 1810
Flora of Western Australia
flaccidus
Taxa named by Robert Brown (botanist, born 1773)
Flora of the Northern Territory
Flora of Queensland
Flora of New South Wales